Papilio scamander, the Scamander swallowtail, is a butterfly of the family Papilionidae. It is found from eastern and south-eastern Brazil south into Argentina.

The wingspan is about 110 mm.

Subspecies
Papilio scamander scamander (Brazil)
Papilio scamander joergenseni Röber, 1925 (Bolivia, north-western Argentina)
Papilio scamander grayi Boisduval, 1836 (Brazil (Rio Grande do Sul, Paraná, Minas Gerais, São Paulo))

External links
Species info
Species info

scamander
Papilionidae of South America
Butterflies described in 1836